Cordillera Mountains may refer to:
American Cordillera, North and South America
Arctic Cordillera, northeastern Canada
Andes in South-America (Cordillera Oriental, Cordillera Occidental, and Chile's Cordillera de la Costa)
Cordillera Central (Luzon) in the Philippines